Laskarina Bouboulina (1771 – 22 May 1825) was a Greek naval commander, heroine of the Greek War of Independence in 1821, and considered the first woman to attain the rank of admiral.

She was born in Constantinople in 1771 into a family of Arvanite origin. During her youth she developed an interest in sailing which was facilitated by her stepfather's liberal attitude to education. She was widowed twice, inheriting a considerable sum of money from her second husband. She later joined the Filiki Etaireia secret society which sought to achieve Greek independence from the Ottoman Empire, being among the few women to do so. Following the outbreak of the Greek War of Independence she commanded a fleet of Spetsiot ships which contributed to several campaigns most notably the Siege of Nafplion.

Following the defeat of her faction in the Greek civil war of 1824 she was expelled to Spetses and briefly imprisoned on false charges. She was killed on 22 May 1825, during the course of a family feud.

Biography

Early life
Bouboulina was born in 1771 in Constantinople; she originated from the local native Arvanite population of the island of Hydra. She was the daughter of Stavrianos Pinotsis, a captain from Hydra island, and his wife Skevo Kokkini. The Ottomans had imprisoned Pinotsis for his part in the failed Orlov revolt of 1769–1770 against the Ottoman rule shortly after the birth of his daughter. Her father died soon afterward and the mother and child returned to Hydra. Bouboulina's family moved to Spetses when she was four years old. Her mother later married Spetsiot Dimitrios Lazarou-Orlov. Lazarou had previously double-barrelled his family name to Lazarou-Orlov in order to commemorate his participation in the Orlov revolt and declare his loyalty to Russia. Bouboulina grew up alongside her half-siblings. During her youth she enjoyed swimming, fishing, riding on horseback, sailing and singing klepht songs. Her stepfather encouraged her interest in sailing beyond the accepted social norms of the time, a decision which has been attributed to his admiration for Russian empress Catherine the Great. Her home's library contained many books from Enlightenment era writers including those of Friedrich von Schiller and Voltaire. 

She married captain Dimitrios Yiannouzas with whom she had three children; Yiannouzas drowned during a battle against Algerian pirates. She later remarried the wealthy shipowner and captain Dimitrios Bouboulis, taking his surname. Bouboulis likewise drowned in a battle against Algerian pirates on 10 May 1811 off the shore of Lampedusa. Bouboulina took over his fortune and his trading business, acquiring shares in other Spetsiot ships. She traveled to Constantinople in 1814. The Ottomans were aware of the fortune Bouboulina had inherited from her husband and were seeking a premise to seize it in 1816. The Ottomans argued that Bouboulis' assets should be forfeited since he had fought on the Russian side during the last Russo-Turkish war. Bouboulina returned to Constantinople in 1816 to argue her case, enlisting the help of the Russian ambassador and the Valide Sultan. The latter was able to convince the Ottoman officials to allow Bouboulina to retain her property.

Greek War of Independence
Bouboulina was visited by nationalist priest Papaflessas in 1818. Following her meeting with Papaflessas, she made her third visit to Constantinople, Bouboulina joining the Filiki Etaireia, an underground organization that was preparing Greece for revolution against Ottoman rule. She would have been one of a few women, but she is not named in historical members lists. Upon her return to Spetses, she ordered the construction of a ship that was larger than Ottoman regulations would allow. The Ottomans dispatched admiral Hussein to ensure Bouboulina adhered to Ottoman law. Bouboulina proceeded to bribe Hussein, who then signed a report indicating that the ship was a long range Spetsiot trade ship. Agamemnon was armed with 18 cannons and went on to become the first warship in modern-day Greece. Upon the outbreak of the Greek War of Independence, Bouboulina sailed on Agamemnon, which was commanded by her son Yiannis Yiannouzas, to Nafplion, along with another ship commanded by her half brother Manolis Lazarou-Orlov, imposing a naval blockade on the city on 4 April 1821. Bouboulina and Staikos Staikopoulos then appealed to the Spetsiots who dispatched seven more ships to assist in the siege. Bouboulina commanded great respect among the revolutionaries who nicknamed her Kapetanissa (Captain) and Kyra (Lady). On 10 April, the besieged Ottomans exploited the fact that the Greek sentries were celebrating Orthodox Easter, breaking through the siege. Bouboulina then disembarked at Myloi and traveled to Argos on horseback, supplying the local rebels with money and ammunition. In Argos, Bouboulina participated in a conference of local military commanders and kodjabashis, where the Greeks decided to resume the siege of Nafplion.

The siege of Nafplion continued until the rebels became aware of Kehaya Bey's force which had reached Corinth and was heading to relieve the siege. Yiannis Yiannouzas then assembled troops from Argos, Spetses and Kranidi in order to check Kehaya Bey's advance and was killed in the ensuing battle outside Argos. Bouboulina subsequently traveled to the battlefield in order to collect her son's remains who was beheaded in the aftermath of the battle. According to Dutch ambassador Taibont de Marigny she personally executed three Ottoman prisoners during her son's funeral ceremony. After failing to capture Argos, Kehaya Bey reinforced Nafplion's garrison and departed for Tripolitsa. Bouboulina then once again imposed a naval blockade of Nafplion. In May 1821, she blockaded Monemvasia with Agamemnon, while the rest of the Spetsiot fleet remained off the shore of Nafplion. The garrison of Monemvasia surrendered on 25 July, at the same time another ship under her command resupplied Galaxidi. Rumors of Bouboulina's exploits spread beyond Greece and many foreign philhellenes sought to meet her. During one such meeting in Astros, one foreign volunteer showed her a lithograph depicting her which he had purchased in Paris. The highly romanticized and inaccurate depiction caused Bouboulina to burst out laughing. 

In September 1821, she arrived in Tripolitsa which was besieged by the troops of general Theodoros Kolokotronis. The Ottomans were on the brink of surrender and were requesting a safe exit of the local officials along with their harems and release of a number of prisoners. On 18 September, Kolokotronis convened a meeting of his officers to discuss the terms offered by their adversaries. Bouboulina took an active part in the negotiations, intervening to save the lives of the women from Hursit's harem upon Valide Sultan's request. Kolokotronis allowed only the officials of Albanian origin to depart the city. Three days later the city fell to the Greeks who massacred the local Muslim population and looted their properties. Bouboulina was subsequently accused on taking part in the looting (which was a common practice in both Greek and Ottoman warfare of the period). After the fall of Tripolitsa, Bouboulina returned to Nafplion to personally oversee its blockade. On 22 November 1822, the Ottomans surrendered the Palamidi fortress. On 3 December 1822, the Ottoman population of Nafplion was allowed to safely depart for Asia Minor, surrendering the city to the Greeks. Bouboulina was appointed to one of the commissions tasked with redistributing the property of Nafplio's Muslim population, a position she abused for personal gain. 

Bouboulina then moved into a house in Nafplion. Soon afterwards she gave her daughter Eleni Boubouli in marriage to Kolokotronis' son Panos Kolokotronis. Panos Kolokotronis was appointed the commander of Nafplion's garrison, making Bouboulina one of the region's most powerful people. Bouboulina stayed in Nafplion until the outbreak of civil war of 1824 during which she supported the pro-Philiki Etaireia faction of Kolokotronis. After the defeat of her faction, Kolokotronis was imprisoned while her house in Nafplion was confiscated and she departed for Spetses.  She was imprisoned for some time on false charges of witchcraft and heresy by her Spetsiot political opponents before being eventually released. On 22 November 1824, Panos Kolokotronis was murdered leading her daughter to join her in Spetses.

Death in feud
Eugenia Koutsi and Bouboulina's son Georgios Yiannouzas had eloped, after the former was forced by her family to betroth a man she disliked. Bouboulina had supported her son's decision. On 22 May 1825, armed members of the Koutsis family went to Bouboulina's house, believing that the couple was hiding inside. When Bouboulina confronted them from the balcony, she was shot and killed by one of the armed men.

Legacy

After her death, Tsar Alexander I of Russia granted Bouboulina the honorary rank of Admiral of the Russian Navy, making her the first woman in world naval history to hold this title. In 2018 she was granted the title of Rear Admiral (expressed in Greek as Υποναύαρχος) in the Hellenic Navy. 

Bouboulina was depicted on the reverse of both the Greek ₯50 banknote of 1978 and the ₯1 coin of 1988–2001. A statue of Bouboulina sculpted by Natalia Mela-Konstantinidou is located at Spetses. A bust of Bouboulina created by Lazaros Lameras is located in Tinos while a copy of it hosted in the Pedion tou Areos. There is also a bust of her at the junction of Bouboulinas street and Emmanouil Sofroni street in Nafplion.
The Greek drama film, Bouboulina, starring Irene Papas in the titular role was released in 1959, it was directed and written by Kostas Andritsos. A documentary film based on a fictionalized account of her life and deeds, The Brave Stepped Back: The Life and Times of Laskarina Bouboulina, was released in 2005, debuting at the Armata Festival in Spetses. 

Her great granddaughter was Lela Karagianni, (sometimes spelled Karayanni or Carayannis) leader of the Greek Resistance cell Bouboulina, during the Second World War.

Notes

References

Sources

External links

 Bouboulina museum official site

1771 births
1825 deaths
Greek murder victims
Eastern Orthodox Christians from Greece
Greek people of the Greek War of Independence
Military personnel from Istanbul
Women in the Greek War of Independence
People murdered in Greece
Deaths by firearm in Greece
Female admirals
Greek admirals
Russian admirals
Arvanites
19th-century Greek businesspeople
18th-century Greek women
1825 murders in Europe
People from Hydra (island)
People from Spetses